Pyracantha (from Greek  "fire" and  "thorn", hence firethorn) is a genus of large, thorny evergreen shrubs in the family Rosaceae, with common names firethorn or pyracantha. They are native to an area extending from Southwest Europe east to Southeast Asia. They resemble and are related to Cotoneaster, but have serrated leaf margins and numerous thorns (Cotoneaster is thornless).

Description 

Leaves are small and oval. The seven species have small white flowers which are 5-merous and many stamened. Fruit are either red, orange, or yellow pomes. The flowers are produced during late spring and early summer; the fruit develops in late summer, and matures in late autumn.

Fruit
The fruit of Pyracantha are classified as pomes. The pulp is safe for human consumption, but it is insipid, and the seeds are mildly poisonous as they contain cyanogenic glycosides (as do apples, plums, cherries, and almonds). Seeds that are chewed and crushed while raw will release cyanogenic glycosides, and can cause mild gastro-intestinal problems when eaten in large enough quantities. The fruit can be made into jelly. The fruits persist significantly into winter which makes them a valuable bird food.

Fossil record
A large number of fossil fruits of †Pyracantha acuticarpa have been described from middle Miocene strata of the Fasterholt area near Silkeborg in Central Jutland, Denmark.

Taxonomy 
Pyracantha is a member of the Rose family, and includes seven species. The genus was defined by 19th century botanist Max Joseph Roemer.

Species
Pyracantha angustifolia. Southwest China.
Pyracantha atalantioides. Southern China.
Pyracantha coccinea. Northeastern Spain east to Northern Iran.
Pyracantha crenatoserrata. Central China.
Pyracantha crenulata. Himalaya.
Pyracantha koidzumii. Taiwan.
Pyracantha rogersiana. Yunnan.

Cultivation
Pyracanthas are valuable ornamental plants, grown in gardens for their decorative flowers and fruit, often very densely borne. The thorns are easily able to puncture human skin, and when successful, the piercing causes a slight inflammation and severe pain. Their dense thorny structure makes them particularly valued in situations where an impenetrable barrier is required. The aesthetic characteristics of pyracanthas, in conjunction with their home security qualities, make them an alternative to artificial fences and walls. They are also good shrubs for a wildlife garden, providing dense cover for roosting and nesting birds, summer flowers for bees and an abundance of berries as a food source.

Cultivars
The following cultivars have won the Royal Horticultural Society's Award of Garden Merit:
Pyracantha 'Orange Glow' (orange berries)
Pyracantha  ('Cadange') (orange berries)
Pyracantha  ('Cadrou') (orange-red berries)
Pyracantha 'Teton' (orange-yellow berries)
Pyracantha rogersiana 'Flava' (yellow berries)

Ecology
Pyracantha fruit can be dispersed into natural areas, allowing plants to invade natural communities. Species of Pyracantha are considered to be invasive in portions of the United States, including the states of California and Georgia. Orange firethorn (Pyracantha angustifolia) is considered to be a weed or potential ("sleeper") weed in several states or territories of Australia, including Victoria, the ACT and New South Wales. As a consequence, importation and propagation are prohibited in some parts of Australia.

References

External links 
 

 
Bird food plants
Rosaceae genera